José Vicente Gómez Umpiérrez (born 31 August 1988) is a Spanish professional footballer who plays as a defensive midfielder.

Club career

Las Palmas
Born in Las Palmas, Canary Islands, Gómez made his debut as a senior with AD Huracán in 2007. In the summer of 2009, he moved to UD Las Palmas; initially assigned to the C team, he spent the entire season with the reserves in Tercera División.

On 22 June 2010, Gómez was definitely promoted to the main squad. He made his professional debut on 1 September, starting and scoring his side's second goal in a 5–3 away loss against Real Valladolid in the second round of the Copa del Rey. He first appeared in the Segunda División three days later, coming on as a second-half substitute for David González in a 0–0 away draw with SD Huesca. 

On 24 September 2011, Gómez scored his first goals at that level, netting a brace in a 4–2 defeat at Girona FC – he was also sent off later in the same match. On 8 June 2012, he signed a new four-year contract running until 2016. 

Gómez appeared in 31 games and scored three goals during the 2014–15 campaign, as the club returned to La Liga after 13 years. He made his debut in the Spanish top flight on 22 August 2015, replacing Hernán in a 1–0 away loss against Atlético Madrid.

Deportivo
On 17 August 2018, Gómez signed a three-year contract with second-tier Deportivo de La Coruña. During his spell at the Estadio Riazor he made 60 appearances across all competitions, being relegated in 2020.

Kerala Blasters
On 23 September 2020, aged 32, Gómez joined Indian Super League club Kerala Blasters FC on a three-year deal. He scored his first goal on 6 December, in the last minute of the 3–1 home defeat of FC Goa. 

Gómez left the Jawaharlal Nehru Stadium on 12 June 2021.

Xanthi
On 20 August 2021, Gómez agreed to a contract at Super League Greece 2 club Xanthi FC.

Career statistics

References

External links
Las Palmas official profile  

1988 births
Living people
Spanish footballers
Footballers from Las Palmas
Association football midfielders
La Liga players
Segunda División players
Tercera División players
Divisiones Regionales de Fútbol players
UD Las Palmas Atlético players
UD Las Palmas players
Deportivo de La Coruña players
Indian Super League players
Kerala Blasters FC players
Super League Greece 2 players
Xanthi F.C. players
Spanish expatriate footballers
Expatriate footballers in India
Expatriate footballers in Greece
Spanish expatriate sportspeople in India
Spanish expatriate sportspeople in Greece